Zwieback is a form of rusk eaten in Germany, Poland, Scandinavia, Austria, France, Belgium, The Netherlands, Switzerland, Italy, Slovenia, Bosnia-Herzegovina, Croatia, Serbia, North Macedonia, Bulgaria, Greece, and Turkey. It is a type of crisp, sweetened bread, made with eggs and baked twice. It originated in East Prussia. According to Fabian Scheidler, Albrecht von Wallenstein invented zwieback to feed his mercenary army during the Thirty Years' War. The Mennonites brought Zwieback to the Russian Empire; before the Russian Revolution, when many emigrated to the west,  they brought Zwieback to Canada, the United States and other parts of the world.

There are two types of zwieback. One type is made by pinching round pieces of dough, placing one piece on top of another, pressing them together by pushing a finger down through both pieces.  It is then baked and served as warm soft rolls.  This type is identified with Mennonites.
The other type is a bread sliced before it is baked a second time, which produces crisp, brittle slices that closely resemble melba toast. Zwieback is commonly used to feed teething babies  and as the first solid food for patients with an upset stomach.

The name comes from German zwei ("two") or zwie ("twi-"), and backen, meaning "to bake". Zwieback hence literally translates to "twice-baked". The French and Italian names, respectively, biscotte and fette biscottate have the same origin, biscotto (biscuit), which also means twice ("bis-") baked (-"cotto"). The Slovene name is prepečenec which would imply baked over ordinary or overbaked. The Serbo-Croatian name is dvopek which, again, is literally twice (dvo) baked (pek).

See also

Biscotti
Brandt (company)
Russian Mennonite zwieback (Tweebak)
Toast

References

German breads
Sweet breads
Twice-baked goods